Kerley is a surname. Notable people with the surname include:

A. James Kerley, American academic, and the current President of Gulf Coast Community College
David Kerley (born 1957), correspondent for ABC News, based in Washington, D.C.
Don Kerley (1917–1996), Australian rules footballer
Ellis R. Kerley (1924–1998), American anthropologist, and pioneer in the field of Forensic anthropology
Fred Kerley (born 1995), American track and field athlete
Harry Kerley (1894–1987), Australian rules footballer
Jack Kerley, American author
James Kerley, Australian TV and radio presenter
Jeremy Kerley (born 1988), American footballer
Neil Kerley (born 1934), former Australian rules football player and coach
Peter Kerley CVO (1900–1979), radiologist
Stephen Kerley (born 1953), former Australian rules footballer

See also
Kerley lines, sign seen on chest radiographs with interstitial pulmonary edema
Kerley's Harbour, Newfoundland and Labrador, small place southwest of Catalina
The Dave & Kerley Show, Australian television series